FC Diables Rouges is a Barthéloméen football club. The club plays in the Saint-Barthelemy Championships, where they finished third during the 2014–15 season.

References 

Diables